Siena is a city in Italy, and the capital of the Province of Siena.

Siena may also refer to:

Education

Australia
 Siena Catholic College, Sippy Downs, Queensland
 Siena College (Camberwell), Melbourne, Victoria

Philippines
 Siena College of Quezon City in the Philippines
 Siena College of Taytay, Rizal, Philippines

United States
 Siena College, Loudonville, New York
 Siena College Research Institute
 Siena College (Memphis, Tennessee), a former college in Tennessee
 Siena Heights University, Adrian, Michigan
 Siena School, Silver Spring, Maryland

People
 Eugenio Siena (1905–1938), Italian racing driver
 Siena Agudong (born 2004), American actress

Fictional
 Siena (Hannah Montana), a character in the TV series Hannah Montana
 Siena Blaze, a fictional mutant in the Marvel Universe

Sports
 Montepaschi Siena, a professional Basket League A Series basketball club from Siena, Tuscany, Italy
 Robur Siena, an Italian football club from Siena, Tuscany, Italy
 Siena Baseball Field, a baseball venue in Loudonville, New York, United States

Transportation
 Fiat Siena, an Italian compact sedan
 Siena–Ampugnano Airport, a former military airfield near Siena, Tuscany, Italy
 Siena railway station, a railway station in Siena, Italy

Other
 Siena Cathedral, a medieval church in Siena, Tuscany, Italy
 Siena Reno, a hotel in Reno, Nevada, United States
 51st Infantry Division Siena, an infantry division of Italy during World War II

See also
 Sienna (disambiguation)
 Siena College (disambiguation)